Canvas is the fifth Korean extended play by South Korean boy group NU'EST. It was released on August 29, 2016 by Pledis Entertainment and distributed by Loen Entertainment. The extended play features five original tracks.

Background
On August 20, 2016, NU'EST released a series of individual teaser images, along with a group image. The following days, individual teaser videos and the official teaser were revealed, following with a highlight medley. The full music video for the title track "Love Paint" was released on August 29, 2016. "Daybreak" was released as a digital single on October 6, 2016 along with a music video.

Composition

Canvas is a continuation of the narrative that began with the extended play Q is released earlier in 2016, with the sentences "Winter is gone", "But still missing", and "Waiting Q" appearing in the teaser video. The album was made on the concept of "24 hours in a day", where each track of the song corresponds to a specific time in the day.

"Daybreak", a duet between Minhyun and JR, is a medium-tempo soul R&B song mixed with a jazz groove representing the dawn and was written to give both "sad and hopeful feelings" at the same time. Minhyun and JR both wrote the lyrics during the dawn.

"R.L.T.L." represents morning, with bird chirps in the intro. "Thank You" was written as a message of gratitude to NU'EST's fans, and "Look" is a fast-tempo song conveying the "lively and active feeling of the night."

The title track for Canvas, "Love Paint", was produced by Mafly and Bumzu, fusing future bass and R&B with a classical orchestra sound. The song represents the afternoon.

Commercial performance 
Canvas debuted at #3 at Gaon Weekly Music Chart and #12 at Gaon Social Chart. Initial album sales were poor upon release, selling only 6,359 copies. Following NU'EST's appearance on Produce 101 Season 2, Canvas re-entered the Gaon Weekly Music Chart at #54 with the group's other four albums. By September 2017, the album had sold an additional 19,742 copies.

The album also peaked at #12 on the US Billboard World Albums Chart.

Track listing

Charts and sales

Album chart

Sales

References 

NU'EST albums
K-pop EPs
2016 EPs
Korean-language EPs
Kakao M EPs
Hybe Corporation EPs